Octadecylphosphonic acid (C18H39O3P) is a chemical compound used in thermal paper for receipts, adding machines and tickets.

References

Phosphonic acids